The Albert-Eden-Puketāpapa Ward is an Auckland Council ward which elects two councillors and covers the Albert-Eden and Puketāpapa Local Boards. Currently the councillors are Christine Fletcher and Julie Fairey. Prior to 2019, this ward was known as the Albert-Eden-Roskill Ward.

Demographics

Albert-Eden-Puketāpapa ward (then called Albert-Eden-Roskill) had a population of 156,177 at the 2018 New Zealand census, an increase of 8,544 people (5.8%) since the 2013 census, and an increase of 14,397 people (10.2%) since the 2006 census. There were 49,356 households, comprising 77,505 males and 78,672 females, giving a sex ratio of 0.99 males per female. The median age was 34.0 years (compared with 37.4 years nationally), with 26,808 people (17.2%) aged under 15 years, 40,662 (26.0%) aged 15 to 29, 71,751 (45.9%) aged 30 to 64, and 16,959 (10.9%) aged 65 or older.

Ethnicities were 50.1% European/Pākehā, 6.7% Māori, 10.5% Pacific peoples, 38.3% Asian, and 4.1% other ethnicities. People may identify with more than one ethnicity.

The percentage of people born overseas was 45.4, compared with 27.1% nationally.

Although some people chose not to answer the census's question about religious affiliation, 43.7% had no religion, 33.0% were Christian, 0.3% had Māori religious beliefs, 9.1% were Hindu, 4.4% were Muslim, 2.4% were Buddhist and 2.6% had other religions.

Of those at least 15 years old, 51,648 (39.9%) people had a bachelor's or higher degree, and 12,366 (9.6%) people had no formal qualifications. The median income was $35,300, compared with $31,800 nationally. 28,299 people (21.9%) earned over $70,000 compared to 17.2% nationally. The employment status of those at least 15 was that 67,830 (52.4%) people were employed full-time, 18,927 (14.6%) were part-time, and 5,004 (3.9%) were unemployed.

Councillors

Election results 
Election results for the Albert-Eden-Puketāpapa Ward (Albert-Eden-Roskill Ward until 2019):

2022 election results

References

Wards of the Auckland Region